María Julia Casanova (1916-2004) is recognized for her long career as a script writer for radio and television and as a theater designer and director.

Biography
María Julia Casanova was born in Havana, Cuba, in 1916. She worked for children's theater in Mexico and wrote for the radio serial La Impostora broadcast on Cuba's CMQ station. With Margot de Blanck she founded the Sala Teatro Hubert de Blanck in Havana, in which she occasionally presented her own plays such as Hechizadas and Mujeres.

Exiled in Miami, Florida, in 1960, Casanova worked in radio and later with Sociedad Pro-Arte Grateli. With Armando Navarro and Roberto Miñagorri, she founded the Sala Teatro La Danza, which debuted with the play Corona de Amor by Alejandro Casona and adapted by Casanova. Casanova also worked for the magazine publisher Editorial de Armas.

In the 1980s, she served as artistic director for the Teatro Bellas Artes in Miami, where she presented original works such as Lucy and La Reina Enamorada, and designed theater sets for Teatro Avante. In the 1990s, she realized her dream of owning a theater and opened the Teatro Casanova on Miami's Calle Ocho. Ediciones Universal published her autobiography, Mi vida en el teatro, in 2000. Four years later, María Julia Casanova died in Miami.

Works or publications

Notes and references

External links

 The María Julia Casanova papers are available at the Cuban Heritage Collection, University of Miami Libraries. The María Julia Casanova Papers primarily document the work of radio and television writer and theater designer and director María Julia Casanova (1916-2004) in Cuba and Miami. The Papers include her scripts, photographs, clippings, theater programs, set and costume designs, posters, audiovisual materials, memorabilia, and honors and awards.
 Selected set and costume designs from the María Julia Casanova papers are available through the University of Miami Libraries Digital Collections portal.
 Creator page for María Julia Casanova in the Cuban Theater Digital Archive.

1916 births
2004 deaths
Cuban theatre directors
Cuban dramatists and playwrights
Hispanic and Latino American dramatists and playwrights
Cuban emigrants to the United States
20th-century American dramatists and playwrights